= Justin Lallier =

Henry Justin Lallier (21 June 1823 - 12 August 1873) was the producer in 1862 of the first printed stamp album.
